

The Alucitidae or many-plumed moths are a family of moths with unusually modified wings. Both fore- and hind-wings consist of about six rigid spines, from which radiate flexible bristles creating a structure similar to a bird's feather.

This is a small family, with about a global total of 210 species described to date (though it is likely that some undescribed species remain to be discovered). They are found mostly in temperate to subtropical (but not tropical) regions. But they are rare even in parts of their core range; both in Great Britain and North America for example, only one species is found – the twenty-plume moth (Alucita hexadactyla) – and in the latter region, it is introduced. This smallish moth can often be found fluttering in the evening twilight or resting with its "wings" outstretched. Its larvae feed on honeysuckle (Lonicera). On the other hand, in Continental Europe a considerable number of species, mostly of the large genus Alucita, occur.

Systematics and taxonomy
The taxonomy of this family is somewhat disputed. Here, they are united in superfamily Alucitoidea with the Tineodidae, a diverse group of numerous small genera with about 20 species all together. However, the two supposed Alucitoidea families may be polyphyletic with regard to each other, and Tineodidae better included in Alucitidae. In any case, the similar-looking plume moths (Pterophoroidea) are widely held to be very close, if not the closest living relatives of the Alucitoidea.

Earlier, many authors assumed that the fruitworm moths (Copromorphoidea) were also very closely related to the Alucitidae (and the fringe-tufted moths, Epermeniidae) – according to some, closer in fact than the Pterophoroidea and even the Tineodidae. In this Alucitoidea do not exist; Alucitidae and Tineodidae are assigned to different (but still most closely related) superfamilies. In the treatment here, the Copromorphoidea are presumed to be the most advanced of these lineages of small but fairly "modern" moths, while the Alucitoidea and Pterophoroidea are more primitive.

Genera
The genera presently placed here, sorted alphabetically, are:

 Alinguata
 Alucita
 Hebdomactis
 Hexeretmis
 Microschismus
 Paelia
 Prymnotomis
 Pterotopteryx
 Triscaedecia

Footnotes

References
 . Version of 2010-AUG-10.
  (1991): Tentative reconstruction of the ditrysian phylogeny (Lepidoptera: Glossata). Entomologica Scandinavica 22(1): 69–95.  (HTML abstract)
  (2003): Alucitoidea. Version of 2003-JAN-01. Retrieved 2011-SEP-24.

External links

 CSIRO High resolution images of two species.
 Deltakey Family description.